The Poduri gas field is a natural gas field located in Poduri, Bacău County. It was discovered in 2012 and developed by Stratum Energy.  It will begin production in 2014 and will produce natural gas and condensates. The total proven reserves of the Poduri gas field are around 235 billion cubic feet (6.7 km³), and production is slated to be around 49 million cubic feet/day (1.4×105m³) in 2014. In 2015 Stratum Energy will become the third largest natural gas producer in Romania after Romgaz and Petrom.

References

Natural gas fields in Romania